The Pistol emoji (🔫) is an emoji usually displayed as a green or orange toy gun or water gun, but historically was displayed as an actual handgun on most older systems. In 2016, the emoji faced controversy due to its perceived meanings. In the same year, Samsung replaced its realistic revolver design with a water gun emoji. In 2018, most major platforms also followed to change their revolver emojis to water gun icons.

Development and usage history

The pistol emoji was originally included in proprietary emoji sets from SoftBank Mobile and au by KDDI. In 2007, Apple encoded them using SoftBank's Private Use Area scheme. As part of a set of characters sourced from SoftBank, au by KDDI, and NTT Docomo emoji sets, the gun emoji was approved as part of Unicode 6.0 in 2010 under the name "Pistol". Global popularity of emojis then surged in the early to mid-2010s. The pistol emoji has been included in the Unicode Technical Standard for emoji (UTS #51) since its first edition (Emoji 1.0) in 2015.

Controversy and popularity in social media 

The "pistol" emoji was commonly used for serious intent or threats until 2018, when it is now used for playful purposes, in most cases. On August 1, 2016, Apple announced that in iOS 10, the pistol emoji 🔫 would be changed from a realistic revolver to a water pistol after the continuing gun violence in the U.S. Conversely, the following day, Microsoft pushed out an update to Windows 10 that changed its longstanding depiction of the pistol emoji as a toy ray-gun to a real revolver. Microsoft stated that the change was made to bring the glyph more in line with industry-standard designs and customer expectations. By 2018, most major platforms such as Google, Microsoft, Samsung, Facebook, and Twitter had transitioned their rendering of the pistol emoji to match Apple's water gun implementation. Apple's change of depiction from a realistic gun to a toy gun was criticised by among others the editor of Emojipedia, because it could lead to messages appearing differently to the receiver than the sender had intended. There are a few platforms that still show realistic gun images, such as LG and Mozilla, but these are being forced to drop out.

Insider Rob Price said it created the potential for "serious miscommunication across different platforms", and asked "What if a joke sent from an Apple user to a Google user is misconstrued because of differences in rendering? Or if a genuine threat sent by a Google user to an Apple user goes unreported because it is taken as a joke?" Margaret Rhodes of Wired said that "Apple's squirt gun emoji hides a big political statement." The Collegiate Times claims that "the use of the firearm emoji does not always indicate gun violence." Jonathan Zittrain of The New York Times claimed that Apple should be no more responsible if someone uses a gun image in the abstract than if someone happens to type the word "gun." In 2021, The Daily Show with Trevor Noah discussed gun emoji usage.

Criminal charges for use of Pistol emoji

In 2016, a 12-year-old girl in the United States was charged with sending a message including the text, "meet me in the library Tuesday" with a "gun emoji" as well as other emojis included. She was charged with "computer harassment", but ultimately the "threat" was deemed "not credible."

In 2015, a middle school student in Virginia faced felony charges after she posted an Instagram comment threatening her fellow students with a gun emoji, while In 2016, a man from France was jailed for 3 months after sending his ex-girlfriend a gun emoji. In the same year, a 12-year-old girl faced criminal charges for using certain emojis including gun emoji.

In 2015, in Brooklyn, New York, a 17-year-old boy named Osiris Aristy was charged for use of the pistol emoji in part of what was construed to be a threat. According to Reason Magazine's Elizabeth Nolan Brown reporting, "Cops were dispatched to Aristy's house, which they searched, finding marijuana and a firearm. In addition to charges for making "terroristic threats" and "aggravated harassment," Aristy was also charged with drug and weapon possession. He was subsequently arraigned, with bail set at $150,000."

References

Individual emoji
Firearms